Candlewood Lake is a census-designated place in Morrow County, in the U.S. state of Ohio.

History
Candlewood Lake had its start in the 1970s as a planned community.

Government
The governance of Candlewood Lake consists of a 9 member board of trustees. One-third of these seats are up for reelection each year.

References

External Links
Website

Unincorporated communities in Morrow County, Ohio
1970s establishments in Ohio
Unincorporated communities in Ohio